The Bücker Bü 131 Jungmann (freshman, young man) is a German 1930s basic training aircraft which was used by the Luftwaffe during World War II.

Development
After serving in the Kaiserliche Marine in World War I, Carl Bücker moved to Sweden where he became managing director of Svenska Aero AB (Not to be confused with Svenska Aeroplan AB, SAAB). He later returned to Germany with Anders J Andersson, a young designer from SAAB. Bücker Flugzeugbau GmbH was founded in Berlin-Johannisthal, in 1932, with the first aircraft to see production being the Bü 131 Jungmann.

While it was Bücker Flugzeugbaus first production type, the Bü 131A was the last biplane built in Germany.  It had two open cockpits in tandem and fixed landing gear.  The fuselage was steel tube, covered in fabric and metal,  the wings wood and fabric.  It first flew on the  Hirth HM60R.

In 1936, it was followed by the Bü 131B, with a  Hirth 504A-2.

Most wartime production for the Luftwaffe was by Aero in Prague.

Operational history

Sturdy and agile, the Bü 131A was first delivered to the Deutscher Luftsportverband (DLV). The Bü 131B was selected as the primary basic trainer for the German Luftwaffe, and it served with nearly all of the Luftwaffes primary flying schools during the war, as well as with night harassment units such as Nachtschlacht Gruppen (NSGr) 2, 11, and 12. Yugoslavia was the main prewar export customer; "as many as 400 may have found their way" there. She was joined by Bulgaria with 15 and Romania with 40.

Production licenses were granted to Switzerland, which operated 94, of which 88 were built under licence by Dornier. About 530 were built in Spain with production continuing at CASA until the early 1960s, and they remained in service as the Spanish Air Force's primary basic trainer until 1968. Hungary operated 315, while ten were built in Czechoslovakia by Tatra as the T 131, before World War II. 
In Japan, 1,037 were built for the Imperial Japanese Army Air Service with Hatsukaze engines as the Kokusai Ki-86 and 339 for the Imperial Japanese Navy Air Service as the Kyushu K9W.

In the 1960s and early 70s the Spanish, Swiss and Czech governments sold their Jungmanns to private owners and many were exported to the United States. About 200 Jungmanns survive to this day, many having been fitted with  Lycoming O-320  or  O-360 four-cylinder horizontally-opposed engines with inverted fuel and oil systems for aerobatic flight.

The Jungmann is prized for its outstanding handling characteristics when compared to other antique bi-planes and even some modern aerobatic types. Upkeep and maintenance for the Jungmann is comparable to other antique aircraft and is superior when fitted with the Lycoming engines. Airframe parts are available from sources both in the United States and Europe.

In 1994, the  Bü 131 was restored to production briefly using CASA jigs by Bücker Prado in Spain, with 21 aircraft constructed as the BP 131, while in Poland SSH Janusz Karasiewicz also started production of a version of the Jungmann based on Czech plans in 1994. 20 were manufactured in Poland between 1994 and 2000.

Variants

Bü 131A
 Two-seat primary trainer biplane. Initial production version.
Bü 131B
 Improved version, powered by the more powerful Hirth HM 504A-2 piston engine.
Bü 131C
 Experimental version, fitted with  Cirrus Minor piston engine. One built.
Nippon Kokusai Ki-86A Army Type 4 Primary Trainer
 Japanese production version for the Imperial Japanese Army Air Service. Powered by a Hitachi Ha47
Nippon Kokusai Ki-86B Army Type 4 Primary Trainer
Wooden airframe version to relieve scarce supplies of strategic materials.
Kyushu K9W1 Momiji Navy Type 2 Trainer Model 11
 Japanese production version for the Imperial Japanese Navy. Powered by the Hitachi GK4A Hatsukaze 11
Tatra T.131
 Czechoslovakia, pre-war licence production in Tatra Kopřivnice.
Aero C-4
 Mass-produced in Aero factory in occupied Czechoslovakia during wartime under original Bücker Bü 131B designation, used postwar with original Hirth engine.
Aero C-104
 Czechoslovakia, postwar development with a Walter Minor 4-III engine, 260 built.
CASA 1.131
 Spanish license-built versions with Hirth HM 504 or  ENMA Tigre G-IVA.
BP 131
 modern license-built version
SSH T-131P
 Pre-production modern Polish version, powered by  Walter Minor 4-III engine. Four built from 1994.
SSH T-131PA
Main Polish production version, with  LOM M332AK engine. First flew 1995. Three preproduction built 2012 and 29 series production aircraft by 2022.

Operators

Bulgarian Air Force

Czechoslovak Air Force
Czechoslovakian National Security Guard

Zrakoplovstvo Nezavisne Države Hrvatske

Luftwaffe

Hellenic Air Force

Royal Hungarian Air Force

Imperial Japanese Army Air Service 
Imperial Japanese Navy Air Service

 Aeroclub of Lithuania

Royal Netherlands Air Force

Polish Air Force (1 bought for tests before 1939)

Royal Romanian Air Force
Romanian Air Force

Slovak Air Force (1939–45)

South African Air Force

Spanish Air Force

Swiss Air Force

Yugoslav Royal Air Force

SFR Yugoslav Air Force

Specifications (Bü 131B)

See also

References

Notes

Citations

Bibliography
 Bridgeman, Leonard. "The Bücker Bü 131B 'Jungmann'." Jane's Fighting Aircraft of World War II. London: Studio, 1946. .
 Gerdessen, Frederik. "Estonian Air Power 1918 – 1945". Air Enthusiast, No. 18, April – July 1982. pp. 61–76. .
 Jackson, Paul. Jane's All The World's Aircraft 2003–2004. Coulsdon, UK: Jane's Information Group, 2003. .
 Ketley, Barry, and Mark Rolfe. Luftwaffe Fledglings 1935–1945: Luftwaffe Training Units and their Aircraft. Aldershot, GB: Hikoki Publications, 1996. .
 König, Erwin. Bücker Bü 131 "Jungmann"(Flugzeug Profile 27) (in German). D-86669 Stengelheim, Germany: Unitec Medienvertrieb e.K., 
 König, Erwin. Die Bücker-Flugzeuge (The Bücker Aircraft) (bilingual German/English). Martinsried, Germany: Nara Verlag, 1987. .
 König, Erwin. Die Bückers, Die Geschichte der ehemaligen Bücker-Flugzeugbau-GmbH und ihrer Flugzeuge (in German). (1979)

 Mondey, David. The Hamlyn Concise Guide to Axis Aircraft of World War II. London: Chancellor Press Ltd, 2006. .
 Sarjeant, L. F. Bücker Bü 131 Jungmann (Aircraft in Profile 222). Windsor, Berkshire, UK: Profile Publications, 1971.
 
 Smith, J. Richard and Antony L. Kay. German Aircraft of the Second World War. London: Putnam and Company, 3rd impression 1978, pp. 91–92. .
 Wietstruk, Siegfried. Bücker-Flugzeugbau, Die Geschichte eines Flugzeugwerkes (in German). D-82041 Oberhaching, Germany: Aviatik Verlag, 1999. .
 Wood, Tony and Bill Gunston. Hitler's Luftwaffe: A Pictorial History and Technical Encyclopedia of Hitler's Air Power in World War II. London: Salamander Books Ltd., 1977, p. 139. .

Biplanes
Single-engined tractor aircraft
1930s German military trainer aircraft
Bücker aircraft
Aerobatic aircraft
Aircraft first flown in 1934
World War II aircraft of Switzerland